Until the Azalea Blooms is a South Korean miniseries starring Yum Jung-ah and Yoo Tae-woong. It aired on KBS2 from January 5 to January 27, 1998.

Based on the 1996 essay by Mansudae ballerina Shin Young-hee Until the Rhododendron Blooms, which portrays North Korean society during Kim Il-sung's regime, the show dramatizes her life in the north of the peninsula, the public execution of Woo In-hee, a mistress of North Korean leader Kim Jong-il, which she personally witnessed, and her defection to South Korea. One of its three writers, Jung Sung-san, was also a defector from North Korea, and the series was his first work in South Korea.

The first two episodes achieved a viewership rating of 16–21%, but the series was criticized for being overly sensational, ridiculing North Korea and distorting the original work. The author herself, in early October 1997, tried to stop the show from airing, filing an injunction against KBS for copyright infringement and asking for a halt of the production of the drama. On January 5, 1998, the same day the series began airing, the Seoul Central District Court rejected the injunction, saying "There is no reason".

Until the Azalea Blooms, remembered nowadays as one of the first entertainment programs that portrays North Korea without propaganda purposes, was negatively received by North Korea, which threatened to kill the staff and bomb KBS headquarters if the channel aired it, as the drama deals with corruption in the North; on the other hand, KBS listeners in North Korea sent letters to encourage the producers to expose "the atrocities of dictators". North Korea banned it too, but it has nevertheless circulated and people have been punished and executed for watching it. The series was extremely sensitive in North Korea, as it revealed the very existence of Kippumjo (pleasure group).

Cast
 Yum Jung-ah as Joo Myung-hee (Shin Young-hee)
 Yoo Tae-woong as Kang Ryong-nam
 Yoon Dong-hwan as Han Ji-wook
 Jung Dong-hwan as Kim Jong-il
 Heo Jin as Kim Kyong-hui
 Park Geun-hyung as Lee Chul-kyu
 Park Woong
 Park Won-sook
 Jeong Wook as Hwang Jang-yop
 Jeon Moo-song
 Baek Yoon-sik
 Kim Chung as Rim Hye-ok
 Lee Chi-woo as O Jin-u
 Na O-mi as Woo In-hee
 Han Young-sook as Choi Eun-hee
 Heo Yoon-jung
 No Hyun-hee as Geum-shil
 Hong Seung-hee
 Kim Ji-yeon as Kim Seung-hee
 Choi Yeo-reum as Hee-sook
 Park Geon-shik
 Kim Il-woo
 Kim Ji-won
 Jo Seung-hee as Rim Sook-hee

References

External links
  
Until the Azalea Blooms Episode 1 at YouTube KBS Channel
Until the Azalea Blooms Episode 2 at YouTube KBS Channel
Until the Azalea Blooms Episode 3 at YouTube KBS Channel
Until the Azalea Blooms Episode 4 at YouTube KBS Channel
Until the Azalea Blooms Episode 5 at YouTube KBS Channel
Until the Azalea Blooms Episode 6 at YouTube KBS Channel
Until the Azalea Blooms Episode 7 at YouTube KBS Channel
Until the Azalea Blooms Episode 8 at YouTube KBS Channel

Korean Broadcasting System television dramas
Korean-language television shows
1990s South Korean television series
1998 South Korean television series debuts
1998 South Korean television series endings
North Korea in fiction